The Sport of Kings is a 1931 British comedy film directed by Victor Saville and starring Leslie Henson, Hugh Wakefield and Gordon Harker. It was based on the 1924 play of the same title by Ian Hay.

The film was made by Gainsborough Pictures at British and Dominions Elstree Studios. The film's sets were designed by the art director Walter Murton.

Premise
A stern Justice of the Peace takes over a firm of bookmakers.

Cast
 Leslie Henson as Amos Purdie
 Hugh Wakefield as Algernon Sprigg
 Gordon Harker as Bates
 Jack Melford as Sir Reginald Toothill
 Willie Graham as Albert
 Dorothy Boyd as Dulcie Primrose
 Renee Clama as Jane
 Mary Jerrold as Mrs. Purdie
 Barbara Gott as Cook
 Daphne Scorer as Lizzie
 Wally Patch as Panama Pete

References

Bibliography
 Wood, Linda. British Films, 1927-1939. British Film Institute, 1986.

External links

1931 films
1931 comedy films
Films based on works by Ian Hay
Films directed by Victor Saville
British comedy films
Films shot at Imperial Studios, Elstree
Gainsborough Pictures films
Films set in England
British black-and-white films
Films produced by Victor Saville
1930s English-language films
1930s British films